Corydalis intermedia is a species of flowering plant belonging to the family Papaveraceae.

It is native to Europe.

References

intermedia